Alcamo wine is produced under the DOC classification of Alcamo, Sicily.

In July 1972, the Alcamo DOC was applied to the wines produced in the nine different towns in the vicinity of Alcamo: Calatafimi, Castellammare del Golfo, Gibellina, Balestrate, Camporeale, Monreale, Partinico, San Cipirello and San Giuseppe Jato. Initially, it applied only to the white wines produced in the region. It is now also used for the red and rose wines produced in the region, following Local Wine Law 99.

Grape varieties used for Alcamo wines
 Red wines - Nero d'Avola, as well as the non-native Cabernet Sauvignon, Merlot and Syrah
 White wines - Grillo, Catarratto, Inzolia, Grecanino and the non-native Sauvignon Blanc and Chardonnay

Alcamo wine producers
28 producers sell wine under the Alcamo DOC:

References

Italian wines